Nagao Station is the name of two train stations in Japan:

 Nagao Station (Kagawa) (長尾駅)
 Nagao Station (Osaka) (長尾駅)
 Nagao Station (Saga) (永尾駅)